Merlin is a siding and former water stop of the Western Pacific Railroad, located along the Feather River in Plumas County, California.

References

Transportation in Plumas County, California